Charles John Zwick (July 17, 1926 – April 20, 2018) was an American civil servant who served as director of the United States' Office of Management and Budget from January 29, 1968, until January 21, 1969, under the administration of Lyndon B. Johnson.

Zwick was born in Plantsville, Connecticut and attended a rural one-room school. He served in the military from 1946 to 1948. Zwick attended the University of Connecticut. A college roommate of the late Bernard P. Dzielinski (of Terryville, CT), Mr. Zwick earned a bachelor's degree in economics in 1950 and a master's degree in agricultural economics in 1951. He earned a doctorate in economics from Harvard University in 1954 and served for two years as a professor at the institution. He worked for the RAND Corporation from 1956 through 1965, where he researched American military and economic assistance programs for Southeast Asian nations.

Zwick joined the Bureau of the Budget in 1965, serving as its deputy director until 1968. During his tenure, Zwick became the last director to submit to Congress a proposal for a balanced budget. He left government at the end of the Johnson administration. Zwick then took a position as CEO of Southeast Banking Corporation, and he served in this capacity for 22 years until his resignation in 1991 due to loses pertaining to real estate investments. Zwick died of cancer in Coral Gables, Florida on April 20, 2018.

References

1926 births
2018 deaths
American chief executives of financial services companies
Connecticut Democrats
Directors of the Office of Management and Budget
Lyndon B. Johnson administration personnel
Military personnel from Connecticut
People from Southington, Connecticut
University of Connecticut alumni
Deaths from cancer in Florida
Carnegie Endowment for International Peace
20th-century American military personnel
Harvard Graduate School of Arts and Sciences alumni